The Salon of Berta Zuckerkandl-Szeps  existed in Vienna from the end of the 19th century until 1938. It was located in her Viennese residence in the Palais Lieben-Auspitz on the Ringstraße.

The first salon of Berta Zuckerkandl was held in a mansion in the Nusswaldgasse in Döbling. Later it was held in the Palais Lieben-Auspitz at the Oppolzergasse 6 at the Ringstraße. The salon was formed in the tradition of Fanny von Arnstein's literary salons in the days of the Congress of Vienna.

Bertha Zuckerkandl's salon claimed such famous participants as Gustav Klimt, Gustav Mahler, Max Reinhardt, Arthur Schnitzler and Alma Mahler.

Her sister Sofie was married to Paul Clemenceau, the brother of the French Prime Minister Georges Clemenceau, giving the salon connections to Parisian circles.

Innere Stadt
Jews and Judaism in Vienna
Jewish Austrian history
19th century in Vienna
Culture in Vienna

de:Salon der Berta Zuckerkandl